is an original video animation that was released in 1998. Tesshō Genda provides the voice of Golgo 13 in the Japanese version, while in the English version, he is voiced by John DiMaggio. The film is set during the 2000 U.S. presidential election cycle and focuses on assassin Golgo 13 as he is hired by a Democratic Party campaign manager to kill female drug lord Queen Bee, who is planning to assassinate the Democratic nominee for president, Robert Hardy. Golgo, however, finds the job too easy and seeks out the true connection between Hardy and Queen Bee.

Golgo 13: Queen Bee was released on May 21, 1998 in Japan by Tezuka Productions and Filmlink International, and on DVD in English-speaking regions in 2001 by Urban Vision Entertainment.

Plot 
Golgo 13: Queen Bee is set during the 2000 U.S. presidential election cycle. In New York, Golgo 13 is hired by Democratic Party campaign manager and vice presidential candidate Thomas Waltham to assassinate Queen Bee, the second-in-command of the South American terrorist group Comnerro Liberation Front, to prevent her from killing Democratic nominee Robert Hardy.

At a local bar, Golgo learns from his informant that Queen Bee’s real name is Sonia, and she and the Comnerro are planning to distribute cocaine throughout the United States with help from mafia boss Don Roccini. He speculates that she wants to kill Hardy because he represents a threat to her drug operation. But Golgo finds the job too easy and seeks to find the true connection. Not long after, Sonia shows up and encounters Golgo. She invites him to her hotel room where they have sex, and asks him to assassinate Hardy for $1.2 million, but Golgo declines her offer. Sonia then learns that she has been marked for assassination by Golgo, but he lets her escape. 

Meanwhile, Waltham travels to California with U.S. Army General Gordon to hire a disgraced lieutenant named Benning to wipe out the Comnerro Front. Golgo also arrives to investigate a ship owned by Sonia and her men, but is forced to retreat after he is shot numerous times. After recovering from his wounds, Golgo's informant comes back from Utah with information on Hardy's past. He reveals that when Hardy was a lawyer, he had an affair with a woman named Vanessa and conceived a child with her named Joanna in 1971. After Hardy was elected to the U.S. House of Representatives in 1982, Vanessa and Joanna disappeared. He says that Joanna was 11 years old back then, and if she is still alive today, she would be the same age as Sonia.

While heading home, Sonia thinks back on her past life. During a dream sequence, it is revealed that Vanessa was killed by Waltham, and that Sonia is actually Joanna, making her Hardy's daughter. Sonia was then raped by Waltham, leading her to believe that her father betrayed her. 

Golgo arrives at the Comnerro base in South America to try and kill Sonia again, but is interrupted by Benning's men, who launch a surprise attack on the base and slaughter most of Sonia's men. Golgo and Sonia work together to fend off Benning's men. Golgo kills Benning, but blacks out from a severe knife wound. In exchange for helping her, Sonia brings Golgo to an abandoned temple to heal his wound and has sex with him again.

Sometime later, the 2000 Democratic National Convention is taking place at Yankee Stadium in New York. While departing the stadium, Hardy stops his limo to meet a young girl with flowers. She calls herself Joanna Hardy, which shocks Hardy and causes him to have flashbacks of his past life. The girl runs back to a woman in a white suit, who is revealed to be Sonia. Hardy eventually learns that Waltham lied about his family’s fate, as he had told him that Vanessa and Joanna moved to Florida and died in a car accident. In reality, Waltham raped Joanna and killed Vanessa.

Sonia shows up during the final day of the convention to assassinate Hardy. Before delivering his acceptance speech, Hardy calls Waltham up to the podium and attempts to kill him, but is tackled by security guards. Hardy uses his gun to commit suicide, causing Sonia to break down in tears. After Hardy's funeral, Sonia arrives at her father's grave to pay respects, and is then shot and mortally wounded by Golgo. In her final moments, she asks Golgo to kill Waltham, as she deposited $1.2 million in his bank account to carry out the hit. Sonia dies, and Golgo accepts the job. In a mid-credits scene, he finds Waltham's yacht, with Waltham, Don Roccini, and General Gordon present. Golgo kills all three men, and departs the scene.

Voice cast

Reception 

Critical reception of Golgo 13: Queen Bee has been mixed to positive. Darius Washington and Allen Divers of Anime News Network both gave the film positive reviews. Washington gave the film a rating of A-, praising the story, characters, and visuals, with his only criticism being the excessive amount of sex scenes, stating that "it's not just that these scenes exist, but they occur for seemingly no reason than just to move the video along, instead of enhancing a very harsh story." Divers gave the film a B rating, calling it a "gritty political thriller that does a good job of keeping the audience on their toes. It's commentary is a bit lacking, but overall, a good step in the right direction."

Not all reviews were positive, however. Jeremy A. Beard of THEM Anime Reviews was far more critical of Queen Bee and gave the film a rating of 2 out of 5 stars, calling the characters, action sequences, and the story uninteresting, and stating overall that "this movie leans heavily on style and I suppose it has some of that, but not enough to make up for everything else."

References

External links 
 
 
 

1998 anime OVAs
OVAs based on manga
Queen Bee
Anime films based on manga
Japanese action films
1990s Japanese-language films
Films directed by Osamu Dezaki